The 2015–16 Wright State Raiders men's basketball team represented Wright State University during the 2015–16 NCAA Division I men's basketball season. The Raiders, led by sixth year head coach Billy Donlon, played their home games at the Nutter Center and were members of the Horizon League. They finished the season 22–13, 13–5 in Horizon League play to finish in a tie for second place. They defeated UIC, Detroit, and Oakland to advance to the championship game of the Horizon League tournament where they lost to Green Bay. Despite having 22 wins, they did not participate in a postseason tournament.

On March 19, head coach Billy Donlon was fired. He finished at Wright State with a six year record of 109–94.

Roster

Schedule

|-
! colspan="9" style="background:#355e3b; color:gold;"| Non-Conference regular season

|-
! colspan="9" style="background:#355e3b; color:gold;"| Horizon League regular season

|-
! colspan="9" style="background:#355e3b; color:gold;"|Horizon League tournament

References

Wright State Raiders men's basketball seasons
Wright State
Wright State Raiders men's b
Wright State Raiders men's b